First Lady or First Gentleman of Kyrgyzstan is the title attributed to the spouse of the president of Kyrgyzstan. The current first lady is Aigul Japarova, the wife of President Sadyr Japarov. To date, there has been no official first gentleman of Kyrgyzstan. The country's first female president, Roza Otunbayeva, was divorced during her presidency.

First ladies of Kyrgyzstan

See also 
 President of Kyrgyzstan

References

 
Presidents of Kyrgyzstan
Kyrgyzstan